The closing ceremony of the 1992 Summer Olympics took place at Estadi Olímpic Lluís Companys in Barcelona, Spain, on 9 August 1992.

Ceremony

Officials and dignitaries

Dignitaries from International organizations
 International Olympic Committee –  IOC President Juan Antonio Samaranch and Members of the International Olympic Committee

Host country dignitaries
 Spain – 
King of Spain Juan Carlos I 
Queen Sofía of Spain
HRH the Crown Prince Felipe
Prime Minister of Spain Felipe González
Infanta Elena, Duchess of Lugo 
Infanta Cristina of Spain
Infanta Pilar, Duchess of Badajoz
Deputy Prime Minister of Spain Narcís Serra
President of the Barcelona'92 Olympic Organising Committee and Mayor of Barcelona Pasqual Maragall
Diana Garrigosa

 Catalonia – Jordi Pujol, President of Catalonia and members of the Government

Dignitaries from Abroad
 United States – 
Vice President Dan Quayle
Second Lady Marilyn Quayle
actor Arnold Schwarzenegger
Mayor of Atlanta Maynard Jackson
Marvin Bush, President's son
Mayor of the District of Columbia Sharon Kelly
 United Kingdom – Prime Minister of the United Kingdom John Major
 Sweden – King of Sweden Carl Gustaf XVI

Opening

Parade of Nations 
The flag bearers of 172 National Olympic Committees entered the stadium informally in single file, ordered by the Spanish alphabet, and behind them marched the athletes, without any distinction or grouping by nationality.

Closing
COOB President Pasqual Maragall delivered a speech in Catalan, Spanish, and English concluding the ceremonies and thanking everyone. IOC President Juan Antonio Samaranch delivered a speech in Spanish, awarding the Olympic Order in Gold to Pasqual Maragall, President of the Barcelona Organizing Committee and declared the Games of the XXV Olympiad in Barcelona closed. The Mayor of Barcelona Pasqual Maragall handed the Olympic flag to Samaranch, who then handed it to the Mayor of Atlanta, Maynard Jackson in anticipation of the 1996 Games. The flag was raised again 18 months afterward in Lillehammer on 12 February 1994 for the opening ceremony of the 1994 Winter Olympics.

Anthems
 National Anthem of Catalonia
 National Anthem of Spain
 National Anthem of Greece
 National Anthem of the United States
 Olympic Hymn – Plácido Domingo

References

closing ceremony
Ceremonies in Spain
Olympics closing ceremonies